Yur Muhabbat - Walk Love is an Uzbek television drama that aired on Sevimli TV.

The series, produced by Ruslan Mirzayev, was shot in collaboration with Uzbek and Turkish filmmakers in three countries: Uzbekistan, Turkey and the United States. The main roles in the film were played by Uzbek actors Ulugʻbek Qodirov, Sitora Alimjonova, Gavhar Zokirova and Khamid Nizamov - the brightest examples of Uzbek cinema. Momin Rizo, Bahshillo Fatullayev and Karen Gafurjanov played a supporting role in this film.

Plot 
Umar and Zainab, who loved each other very much, got divorced because of Umar's father. Years later, when Umar was about to marry another girl, Zainab came to him as the wife of a new employee, Umar Murad, and they began to work together. How much love from the past affects their fate.

Creation 
The series Yur Muhabbat started in 2018 and was stopped for some reason.

Cast 

 Ulugʻbek Qodirov - Umar
 Sitora Alimjonova - Zaynab
 Gavhar Zokirova - Rano
 Shuxrat Umarov - Ibrohim
 Aziza Halilova - Sevinch
 Khamid Nizamov - Hamza
 Mirshod Atavullayev- Komron
 Mo'min Rizo - Bakir
 Bahshillo Fatullayev -?
 Temur Muxammadxojayev - Ali
 Karen Gafurjanovu - Ahmed

Film crew 

 Producers — Ruslan Mirzayev
 Director — Shuhrat Salomov
 Script writers — Ozan Ayaz and Oğuz Ayaz
 Director of photography — Umid Malikov
 Production designer — Azizbek Najimov
 Composer — Farruh Sobirov
 Costume Designers — Sanobar Anvarova
 Makeup artist — Galina Geydelbax
 Casting director — Zilola Raxmonberdiyeva
 Editing directors — Hojakbar Nurmuxamdedov

Sound post-production

Soundtrack 

Farruh Sobirov was roped in to compose the original soundtrack and score for Yur Muhabbat.

References 

2020s drama television series
2022 Uzbekistani television series debuts
Uzbek-language television shows